Tim Whitten is an Australian record producer, audio engineer, and mixer. He has worked with numerous successful Australian musicians, in a career spanning 1990—present.  Whitten's first recording was Boxcar's Vertigo, where he joined Adrian Bolland as engineer. Whitten has produced records for prominent Australian artists, including Powderfinger, The Go-Betweens, Hoodoo Gurus, and Augie March.

Unlike most producers, who work in a studio, most of Whitten's recording is done at his home, with artists visiting him to collaborate on works. However, he has recorded in studios on some albums. Whitten has explained that his role as a producer is "make a song "work"", even if this requires unorthodox techniques to achieve results. He summarises his work by stating "The role of the producer is to help."

Whitten's work as a producer has been praised by several artists. After working with theredsunband on their EP Like An Arrow, Whitten was praised for producing the new sound of the EP. Lead singer Sarah Kelly stated "it sounds really different it sounds sort of really smooth and pretty and that’s cause of Tim Whitten being involved". Scattered Order have also praised Whitten's work in controlling "noise overload" on several of their records, while Powderfinger's Bernard Fanning described Whitten as better value for money than other producers, resulting in the band choosing him for Double Allergic. Gaslight Radio have noted Whitten's enthusiasm, after a chance meeting resulted in him working with the band on a new album.

References

External links

Australian audio engineers
Australian record producers
Living people
Year of birth missing (living people)